Lelia or Lélia may refer to:

 People
 Lélia Abramo (19112004), Italian-Brazilian actress and political activist
 Carmen Lelia Cristóbal (born before 1959), Argentine botanist
 Lelia Doolan (born 1941), Irish television and theatre producer
 Lelia Dromgold Emig (1872-1957), American genealogist and author
 Lelia Foley (born 1942), first African American woman to be elected mayor in the United States
 Lelia Goldoni (born 1936), American actress who appeared in motion pictures and on television
 Lélia Gonzalez (193594), Brazilian intellectual, politician, professor and anthropologist
 Lélia Gousseau (1909-1997), French classical pianist
 Lelia Green (born before 1994), Australian media theorist
 Lelia Masaga (born 1986), New Zealand rugby union player
 Lelia N. Morris (18621929), American hymnwriter
 Lelia J. Robinson (185091), American lawyer, the first woman to be admitted to the bar and to practice in the courts of Massachusetts
 Lelia P. Roby (1848-1910), American philanthropist; founder, Ladies of the Grand Army of the Republic

 Places
 Lake Lelia, a natural fresh water lake on the south side of Avon Park, Florida
 Lelia Lake, Texas, an unincorporated community in Donley County

 Other
 Lélia, 1833 novel by George Sand
 PS Lelia, a steamship built during the American Civil War for the Confederate States of America
 Lelia (bug), a bug in subfamily Pentatominae

See also 
 A'Lelia Bundles (born 1952), African-American journalist
 A'Lelia Walker (18851931), American businesswoman and patron of the arts
 Layla (disambiguation)
 Leela (disambiguation)
 Leila (disambiguation)
 Lila (disambiguation)